Microsphecia brosiformis is a moth of the family Sesiidae. It is found from the Balkan Peninsula to the Crimea, southern Russia (Sarepta), Asia Minor, the Caucasus, Iran, Turkmenistan and Afghanistan.

The larvae feed on the roots of Convolvulus species, including Convolvulus arvensis.

References

Moths described in 1813
Sesiidae
Moths of Europe
Moths of Asia